United Nations Security Council resolution 533, adopted unanimously on 7 June 1983, after reaffirming Resolution 525 (1982), the Council expressed its concern at the death sentences issued to Thelle Simon Mogoerane, Jerry Semano Mosololi and Marcus Thabo Motaung, all members of the African National Congress.

The resolution called upon the South African authorities to commute the sentences imposed on the men, and urged all other Member States and organisations to help save the lives of the men.

See also
 List of United Nations Security Council Resolutions 501 to 600 (1982–1987)
 Resolutions 503, 525 and 547
 Apartheid

Notes
Text of the Resolution at undocs.org

External links
 

 0533
 0533
June 1983 events
1983 in South Africa